Ba Saw Nyo (also known as Muhammad Shah; 1435–1494) was king of Arakan from 1492 to 1494. He came to power in 1492 after his nephew King Dawlya had died after a failed military expedition. He made Dawlya's mother and his sister-in-law Saw Nandi his chief queen. He faced a serious mutiny by an officer, which was put down. He died of natural causes soon after.

References

Bibliography
 

Monarchs of Mrauk-U
1435 births
1494 deaths
15th century in Burma
15th-century Burmese monarchs